Alameda Municipal Power (formerly Alameda Power & Telecom) is a municipal utility serving the City of Alameda, California.  Founded in 1887, it provides electricity to c. 34,000 residential, commercial, and municipal customers at rates up to 20 percent below neighboring communities.   The first engineer at the plant was HP Nielsen.

As Alameda Power & Telecom, the utility previously provided Cable TV and high-speed Internet services to city residents; their system was acquired by Comcast on November 21, 2008, for $17 million. The estimated net result of this venture was a loss of more than $60 million for the City of Alameda.

During 2014, 22 percent of AMP's power mix came from renewable resources, including biomass (landfill gas) from Pittsburg, Butte, Santa Cruz and Richmond, CA; small hydroelectric from Graeagle and Central Valley CA; and winds from the High Winds Project in Sonoma County, CA. An additional 15 percent of the power mix came from large hydroelectric projects in Calaveras, Shasta, and Central Valley, CA (California does not count power from large hydroelectric dams as renewable). All together, AMP's power is 37% carbon-neutral in 2014.

References

External links 
 
 

Alameda, California
Companies based in Alameda, California
Municipal electric utilities of the United States
Science and technology in the San Francisco Bay Area